Highway 127 (AR 127, Ark. 127, and Hwy. 127) is a designation for four state highways in Northwest Arkansas. One route of  begins at Madison County Road 3345 (CR 3345) and runs northwest to Highway 23 at Aurora. A second route of  begins at US Highway 412 (US 412) at Old Alabam and runs north to Highway 23 at Forum. A third route of  begins at Highway 12 and runs north to Highway 12 near Clifty. A fourth route of  begins at Lost Bridge Village and runs north to US Highway 62 in Garfield. Highway 127 Spur is a spur route of  near the southern terminus of the Lost Bridge Village route that provides access to Lost Bridge Marina. All routes are maintained by the Arkansas State Highway and Transportation Department (AHTD).

Route description

Aurora
The route begins state maintenance at Madison CR 3345 near a junction with Madison CR 3225. Highway 127 winds northwest to Aurora, where it terminates at Highway 23, the Pig Trail Scenic Byway. The route was built in 1985.

Old Alabam to Forum
It runs northwest from US 412 near Old Alabam to AR 23 in Forum near Withrow Springs State Park.

Lookout to Clifty

It runs east from AR 12 at Lookout near Hobbs State Park to terminate at AR 12 northeast of Clifty.

Lost Bridge Village to Garfield
It runs north from Lost Bridge Village to US 62 in Garfield.

History
Highway 127 was first designated between 1927 and September 1, 1928 by renumbering State Road 19 between Old Alabam and Forum. A second segment of Highway 127 was created from Highway 12 to Beaver Lake on August 25, 1965. The highway was rerouted on June 7, 1995  at the request of the Benton county judge to connect to Highway 12 on both ends, and the former alignment was turned back to county maintenance. The segment of Highway 127 between Garfield and Lost Bridge Village was created on November 23, 1966. The Aurora segment was created on June 28, 1973 pursuant to Act 9 of 1973 by the Arkansas General Assembly.

Major intersections

Spur route

Route description

The route begins at Highway 127 near Lost Bridge Marina, southeast of Garfield and ends at the north access road to Lost Bridge Public Use Area.

History
The spur route was created by the Arkansas State Highway Commission on August 27, 1969.

Major intersections

See also

 List of state highways in Arkansas

References

External links

127
Transportation in Madison County, Arkansas
Transportation in Benton County, Arkansas